Xuân Thủy (September 2, 1912 – June 20, 1985) was a North Vietnamese political figure. He was the Foreign Minister of North Vietnam from 1963 to 1965 and then chief negotiator of the North Vietnamese at the Paris Peace talks.

Thủy was born in Hà Đông Province in Northern Vietnam on September 2, 1912.  His name means "spring water". He was educated at a French school in Hanoi. Becoming interested in nationalist politics in his early teens, the fourteen-year-old Thuỷ entered the Revolutionary Youth League of the communist leader Ho Chi Minh. At sixteen, he was arrested for the first time. When he was eighteen, he was sent to the penal colony on Côn Sơn Island in the South China Sea. Two further jail terms followed. In 1938, Thuỷ became a member of the Indochina Communist Party. After the outbreak of the Second World War in 1939, he was imprisoned in Sơn La, being held there for six years until the end of the war in 1945. However, he used his internment to edit the underground communist newspaper Suoi Reo.

After his release, Thủy became the editor and director of the newspaper Cứu quốc, the official organ of the Viet Minh national liberation movement formed by Ho Chi Minh in 1941 in opposition to both French and Japanese control over the country. In 1946, he then became a member of the National Assembly of the just-proclaimed Democratic Republic of Vietnam. The Assembly was started by the Viet Minh as a vehicle of resistance against French colonial rule in what would become the First Indochina War. Speaking both French and Chinese fluently and known as an expert in agitprop, Thuỷ traveled both Asia and Europe visiting Vienna, Stockholm, Rangoon, Beijing, and Moscow in 1950 to gather support for the North Vietnamese cause. In 1961 and 1962, he attended the Geneva Conference on Laos as the deputy chairman of the Vietnamese delegation. An American diplomat at the meeting described him as "a top-drawer negotiator, a dreadful fellow to face across the table day after day." In 1963, he then became Foreign Minister of North Vietnam. However, in 1965 he had to step down. Thuỷ's health was cited as the reason for his resignation, yet his losing a power struggle, in which he supported a pro-Soviet line, is the more likely cause. His successor was Nguyen Duy Trinh, an avowed supporter of China in the Sino-Soviet split. Thuỷ then fell out of favor with the ruling party, but he returned to the political scene in 1968, as North Vietnam's chief diplomat at the Paris peace talks. These meetings finally led to American withdrawal from the country. He was known to use long tirades to test the American negotiators' endurance during the meetings. Thuỷ served briefly as one of the Vice Presidents of Council of State from 1981 to 1982. He was also made Vice-Chairman of North Vietnam's National Assembly, a position he retained until his death.

Thuỷ died of heart failure in Hanoi on June 20, 1985.

References

"Xuan Thuy, Hanoi Envoy at Paris Talks, Dies". New York Times. June 20, 1985.
"Xuan Thuy: Abrasive Advocate". Time. May. 10, 1968.
"Xuan Thuy; Negotiator for Hanoi at Paris Peace Talks". Los Angeles Times. June 30, 1985.

1912 births
1985 deaths
Vietnamese people of the Vietnam War
Vietnamese atheists
Vietnamese communists
Vice presidents of Vietnam
Members of the National Assembly (Vietnam)
Foreign ministers of Vietnam
Members of the 4th Secretariat of the Communist Party of Vietnam
Alternates of the 2nd Central Committee of the Workers' Party of Vietnam
Members of the 2nd Central Committee of the Workers' Party of Vietnam
Members of the 3rd Central Committee of the Workers' Party of Vietnam
Members of the 4th Central Committee of the Communist Party of Vietnam
Government ministers of Vietnam
People from Hanoi